Caulerpaceae is a family of green algae in the order Bryopsidales.

Caulerpaceae is considered to be a widespread and vital structural component of many Cenozoic-recent reefs. It is estimated to be responsible for approximately 25-30% of CaCO3 in Neogene fossil reefs.

References

External links

 
Ulvophyceae families